Baotalu is a subdistrict of Runzhou District, Zhenjiang, Jiangsu, China. It has an area of 7.63 square kilometers and a population of 75,004. The total number of households is 28,693. There are eleven communities in Baotalu: Dianlilu Community, Guangdongshanzhuang Community, Lijiashanxincun No. 1 Community, Lijiashanxincun No. 2 Community, Yunhe Community, Fengminxincun Community, Huangshan Community, Chezhan Community, Tongdeli Community, Liming Community, Runzhouhuayuan Community.

References 

Runzhou District
Township-level divisions of Jiangsu